Choe Sejin ([t͡ɕʰwe̞ sʰed͡ʑin]; 1465 – February 10, 1542) was a Korean linguist, and a translator and interpreter of the Chinese language during the Joseon Dynasty. He is of the Goesan Choe clan and his courtesy name was Gongseo (공서; 公瑞). He is widely known for his research with the Korean hangul letters, and comparative studies with Chinese and Korean, which further led to the propagation of hangul during a time period when Chinese characters were used as the main system of writing. Choe was recognized by many for his talents as an official interpreter in the Korean Embassies in Beijing and in his works in hangul research. However, he lived a tumultuous life due to this middle class status, which led him to be the target of many envious aristocrats of his era.

Choe devised the modern Korean order of the hangul characters, and assigned names to the letters.  His most famous book on hangul is the Hunmong Jahoe ("Collection of Characters for Training the Unenlightened", 1527). Over the course of 40 years, he composed 7 original works, and published 10 translations and research works.

Life 
Choe Sejin was born into a middle-class family in Seoul. His father was Choe Jungbal, who was also a translator and interpreter for the government. Choe Sejin's birth year is not found in any records, but given the record found in "Jungjong of Joseon Chronicles", his birth year is estimated as 1465. However, there are other claims that he was born in 1473. When he was 21, he passed the "Translating and Interpreting Government Exam" and when he was 38, he placed second in another exam, the "Bong Se Ja Byul Shi" Exam, an exam conducted to celebrate the crowning of the Prince.

Choe was known as very skilled as a translator and interpreter. However, during a time period when society was strictly stratified, his middle class status restricted his career and even led him to many difficulties and hardships. The noble class organized society in a way that they controlled and possessed a majority of the wealth and property of the country, and it was common for the nobility to be jealous over highly talented middle class government officials who might successfully become promoted, and surpass nobles in rank, although this was very rare. Choe Sejin was a target for the nobles' jealousy, and he was sacrificed in the factional strife and tumultuous political climate at the time. For example, two months after he passed the "Bong Se Ja Byul Shi" Exam, his acceptance became nullified because of an involvement in a trial for the murder of the deposed Queen, Yoon. Even though he was not directly involved, the Minister of Culture and Education, Lee Sejwa, who conducted the exam and personally recommended Choe was involved in the trial, and as a result, all acceptances were nullified. Some were able to retain their acceptance due to familial ties, however, Choe was not one of them. Even after 3 years of waiting, he was accused of writing the anonymous letter criticizing the National Court in 1507 and was subject to a severe sentence. He was saved from this accusation after more investigation, but this highlights the kind of difficulties he faced due to his social class.

Two months after the accusations proved false, he encountered a golden opportunity that allowed him to receive his government rank back. An envoy from China was visiting the King of Joseon, but there was no one appropriate and qualified to serve as the interpreter during the visit. Choe Sejin was chosen as the interpreter reluctantly, but he successfully completed the task and was recognized for his talents. The King recognized his works, and he was able to further his career.

Upon his death, a scholar named Kim An Gook dedicated a poem to Choe. The poem is called "Choi Dong Ji Se Jin Man" (崔同知世珍挽) and is widely known because of the information it holds about Choe Sejin. Because there are few records left about Choe, this poem provides one of the best sources of details about Choe's life through the eyes of his friend, Kim.

Hunmong Jahoe (훈몽자회) and his works with hangul 

Choe Sejin is mostly known for his 1527 work, Hunmong Jahoe (훈몽자회). It is a textbook for children to learn the Chinese characters, and is known to be very practical in its teachings. During the Joseon Era, literacy in Chinese was an essential skill for advancement in society. Chinese was the dominant language of literature at this time, and children were taught Chinese from an early age to prepare for the future. Although hangul, the Korean orthography, existed by this time, it was not widely used in the country. Choe wanted to promote the usage of hangul through his work Hunmong Jahoe. As a textbook for children to learn Chinese, Hunmong Jahoe incorporated hangul in the textbook to promote both the learning of Chinese characters, as well as hangul. The Chinese characters were annotated in hangul, and in order for one to understand and learn the Chinese characters, one must have a full grasp of hangul first to comprehend the annotations. Choe wanted people to use hangul more extensively, and he thought that this would encourage people to take some time to fully learn hangul, before starting to learn Chinese. He wrote that "it would take [only a single day] to learn Hangul", commenting on the simplicity of hangul, and afterwards, one would be able to learn Chinese on their own without an instructor if one knew hangul and utilized his textbook.

This book was known at the time for being revolutionary for its practicality and creativity. The two widely used works for learning Chinese characters during his time were called "Thousand Character Classic" and "Yoo Hap". The "Thousand Character Classic" was considered very tedious and contained words that were conceptual and not suitable for daily use, while the other text "Yoo Hap" was thought to be not suitable for daily instruction. Hunmong Jahoe attempted to supplement these weaknesses, while combining their strengths in the breadth of content. The "Thousand Character Classic" contained 1,000 characters, while Hunmong Jahoe contained 3,360 characters. It also ordered the Chinese characters with relation to its meanings: Chinese characters with similar meanings were grouped together to ease the process of learning.

As one of the phoneticians in the history of the Joseon Dynasty, he compiled the order of the Korean letters in Hunmong Jahoe. The first eight characters in the order that is presented in this work are characterized as sounds that are "used for both the initial and the final sounds". The next eight set of characters are described as "those used only for the initial sounds". These eight characters that occur initially are ordered as the following: "Molar [kh], the Tongue [th], the Lip [ph], the Tooth [c ch], the Half Tooth [z], and the Throat [0]". Only the order of these eight characters have been retained until the present and the order of the other characters as proposed by Choe have been altered. The reason for the change of the order of the other characters are unidentifiable. Choe also ordered the vowels in Hangul. He ordered them according to sequence in which we open our mouth to articulate these vowels. His ordering of the vowels is the order that is currently used in present-day Korea.

Hunmong Jahoe has been republished 10 times over the time period of 400 years. It was the most reproduced Chinese textbook of the Joseon Era, and it was also widely used in Japan.

Career and legacy 
Despite Choe's social class and the difficulties he faced during his lifetime, the records we have of him indicate his significance and influence on Korean hangul, the education of Chinese characters, and the field of linguistics. Scholars that belong to the middle class rarely get recognized for their works, and no historical records are ever kept of middle-class citizens. The available records of Choe are very scarce, however, the sole presence of even a minuscule historical record indicates that he was an influential figure in the history of the Korean language.

When his reputation was restored after he served as a translator to the king during a visit by the Chinese envoy, Choe successfully built his career as a translator, interpreter and linguist. His linguistic talent is even recorded in the Jungjong of Joseon Chronicles, which is a chronological record of King Jungjong's historical reigns from 1506 to 1544. Yoo Soon, a prime minister of the Joseon Dynasty, wrote that Choe was "the best in the nation when it comes to Chinese writing and pronunciation" and that he was worried that there was no one to succeed him to translate and respond to documents sent from China. Thus, Yoo Soon wrote a petition to the King, asking him to pick approximately six talented individuals to be instructed by Choe Sejin, in order to make sure that Choe's legacy was maintained. The King also wrote about his worries that Choe might be the only person capable of handling proper relations with China.

In addition to his skills as a translator and interpreter, his works also contain his legacy. He published a lot in the field of linguistics, especially in the realm of Chinese linguistics directed towards a Korean audience. He translated numerous works such as "Bak Tongsa", Interpreter Park, which was a Chinese textbook, and elaborated on its research through his own work "Sasung Tonghae", Explaining the Four Sounds.

Commentary on Choe Sejin and his works 
There are very scarce resources available to shed light onto Choe Sejin's life. One work that reveals a lot about Choe's character and his influence during his time is a poem written as a eulogy by one of his friends, Kim Ankook. The poem was written in 1542 after Choe's death, and is titled "Choe Dong Ji Se Jin Man" (최동지세진만, 崔同知世珍挽).

This is a poem that reflects Kim Ankook's sorrow upon his friend Choe's death. This is a poem that is one of the most known among Korean linguistics, because there is a lot of information about Choe packed into a single poem. According to Kim, it can be known that Choe went through a lot of hardships during the 40 years he served as a government official, and eventually lived a long life, "having seen the death of many of his loved ones". Another line of the poem, "who will I discuss and debate with when composing diplomat documents?", indicates that he was an important figure in international diplomacy, especially with respect to translation and interpretation. Lastly, Kim notes that his accomplishments will last far into the future, since his works are considered as "a great service to the future". This highlights Choe's influence in the field of Korean linguistics.

Other Notable Works 
In addition to Hunmong Jahoe, Choe also composed 17 research publications over the course of 40 years in total. A few of his most notable works are:

 Sasung Tonghae (사성통해) (1517) marks the intonations, and the correct pronunciations of Chinese characters in hangul. It also includes records of 450 Korean words in hangul, and is an important source for the research on the history of the Korean language.
 Sohak Pyunmong (소학편몽) (1537) is a textbook for Chinese language learners, dedicated to the King.
 Unhoe Okpyun (운회옥편) (1537) is a supplementary material published to add on to the works in Sasung Tonghae.
 Yeohyo Kyung (여효경) (1541) was one of his last works, written when he was 76.
 Kyungsung Ji (경성지) (1541), a work about the Nanjing city in China, was one of his last works before he died at the age of 77.

See also 
 History of Korea
 Joseon Dynasty

References 

1473 births
1542 deaths
16th-century Korean writers
Linguists from Korea
Choe clan of Goesan